Jorge Arturo Martínez Sandoval (born 24 January 1960 in Ciudad Guzmán, Jalisco)is a Mexican former football player and coach. He manages Jaibos Tampico Madero.

Career
In 2009, Martínez managed Liga de Ascenso side Guerreros.

He was the coach of atletico marte in 2001.

References

External links

1960 births
Living people
Footballers from Jalisco
Mexican football managers
Tecos F.C. managers
Expatriate football managers in El Salvador
People from Ciudad Guzmán, Jalisco
Association footballers not categorized by position
Mexican footballers